Eric Jonathan Cassell (August 29, 1928September 24, 2021) was an American physician and bioethicist.

Early life and education 
Eric Jonathan Goldstein was born on August 29, 1928, in New York City. He and his brother changed their surname to Cassell to render it closer to their grandfather's name, which was changed at Ellis Island. He received a BS from Queens College, City University of New York, in 1950, an MA from Columbia University, also in 1950, and an MD from New York University School of Medicine in 1954.

Career 
Cassell taught at Cornell University Medical College and Mount Sinai School of Medicine, and practiced at French Hospital and New York Hospital. He was elected a member of the National Academy of Medicine in 1982.

According to a 2019 critical review of Cassell's work, his views on the nature of suffering were "close to canonical" in the medical community. Cassell advanced a subjective view of suffering, according to which the condition must be understood by reference to the beliefs and perceptions of the person experiencing it.

In 2001, Cassell published a study in Annals of Internal Medicine that assessed the decision-making capacity of severely ill adults, finding that their decision-making abilities were similar to those of children under 10. Commenting on his findings, Cassell stated, "I think it's grossly unfair and I actually think it's an abuse of a patient to put someone in a position to make decisions when they don't have the capacity to make them."

Cassell died on September 24, 2021, in East Stroudsburg, Pennsylvania.

Books

Further reading

References

External links 
 

1928 births
2021 deaths
20th-century American physicians
21st-century American physicians
Bioethicists
Columbia University alumni
Members of the National Academy of Medicine
New York University Grossman School of Medicine alumni
Queens College, City University of New York alumni
Physicians from New York City